Coal Harbour is a small bay 0.5 nautical miles (0.9 km) east of Undine Harbor along the south coast and near the west end of South Georgia. The name Coaling Harbour, given in about 1912, suggests a possible early use of the bay by sealers and whalers. The name was shortened to 'Coal Harbour' by DI personnel who charted the area during the period 1926–30.

Geography of Antarctica